Eadric Streona (died 1017) was Ealdorman of Mercia from 1007 until he was killed by King Cnut. Eadric was given the epithet "Streona" (translated as "The  Acquisitive”) in Hemming's Cartulary because he appropriated church land and funds for himself. Eadric became infamous in the Middle Ages because of his traitorous actions during the Danish re-conquest of England.

Eadric was one of at least eight children and had relatively humble beginnings: his father Ethelric attended the court of King Æthelred the Unready, but was of no great significance and is not known to have had any titles. Even before becoming an ealdorman, Eadric seems to have acted as Æthelred's enforcer; in 1006 he instigated the killing of the Ealdorman of York, Elfhelm. Eadric was married to Æthelred's daughter Eadgyth by 1009, thus becoming his son-in-law. Eadric was appointed Ealdorman of Mercia in 1007.

As an ealdorman, Eadric played an important role in the affairs of the kingdom. In 1009 he negotiated with marauding Vikings to save the life of Archbishop Ælfheah of Canterbury, which proved to be unsuccessful. Eadric also continued to organise the killings of prominent nobles — supposedly upon orders of the king. However, he betrayed his father-in-law in 1015, joining the Dane Cnut, the son of Sweyn Forkbeard, against England.

Accompanying his new liege Cnut, Eadric went on a campaign of plundering throughout England until in the summer of 1016, when a series of major battles were fought with Edmund Ironside, the successor of the deceased king Æthelred. The decisive battle was fought at Assandun on 18 October 1016. Eadric by that time had returned to his brother-in-law's side, but he fled the field with his men for uncertain reasons, though it was possibly pre-planned. After peace was made between Cnut and Edmund, Eadric was allowed to remain earl, however after a year Cnut had Eadric killed at London during the Christmas festivities in 1017.

Name
Eadric's nickname "Streona" is loosely translated as the "Acquisitive" or the "Grasper" and first appears in Hemming's Cartulary.

Early life

Family
Eadric's family appears to have had interests in Shropshire and Herefordshire. John of Worcester names Eadric's father as Æthelric, a thegn who attended court from the late 980s onwards, and his siblings as Brihtric, Ælfric, Goda, Æthelwine, Æthelweard, and Æthelmær, of whom the last is said (probably mistakenly) to have been the father of Wulfnoth Cild, who was the father of Earl Godwin. The chronicler also left a blank space between Ælfric and Goda, as if allowing for the name of another brother. Thegns bearing these names occur among the witnesses to the charters issued in the name of King Æthelred II in the late tenth and early eleventh centuries. These thegns occur quite often in groups of two or three, which might be interpreted as evidence that they were members of the same family. Æthelric seems to have been accompanied from the mid-990s onwards by one or more of his sons (not including Ælfric). Judging from the witness lists, it may be that the name of the other brother was Æthelnoth.

At some time before 1009 Eadric married Eadgyth (Edith), the daughter of King Æthelred. This was a political marriage, intended to strengthen alliances. Although instrumental in serving Æthelred for many years, Eadric ultimately ended up changing his allegiance several times, and betraying his wife's family. There is no record of Eadric and Eadgyth having any children. Eadgyth was likely Eadric's second wife, for according to Henry of Huntingdon, the son of Eadric Streona was responsible for murdering King Edmund "Ironsides". This son, if he existed, would have been born prior to Eadric's marriage to Eadgyth, for any child of Eadgyth would have been too young to encompass murder in 1016 when King Edmund died.

Early career
Eadric himself is perhaps first identifiable in the witness lists of charters, along with his father and brother Brihtric, in 1002. Other members of Eadric's family seem to have been present at court in some strength in 1004–5; there are no lists in which Eadric appears in 1006, but Eadric was reported in that year for being involved in the killing of Ealdorman Ælfhelm:

Eadric does appear among the thegns in 1007 at St Albans Abbey, in which year he was appointed Ealdorman of Mercia. It might have been in 1007, or thereabouts, that Eadric married Eadgyth, daughter of King Æthelred. This may either reflect or account for his sudden rise to prominence, since John of Worcester implies that the marriage had taken place by 1009.

Ealdorman of Mercia

Tribute
Eadric was appointed the Ealdorman of Mercia in 1007. The position had been vacant since 985, when his predecessor Ælfric Cild was driven into exile after being accused of treachery. However, Eadric must have been on better terms with king Ethelred as he was soon married to his daughter Eadgyth.

At this time, Ethelred ordered a new fleet of warships to be built, on a national scale, but this was weakened when Wulfgeat, who was accused by Eadric's brother Brihtric of treason, turned to piracy. With England now more vulnerable to seaborne invasion, an army led by Thorkell the Tall arrived in 1009 and wreaked havoc in much of the country. While Æthelred wanted to retaliate militarily, Eadric dissuaded him. This indecisiveness led to another two years of conflict and only ended when Eadric — while in London — oversaw the payment of £48,000 to the Danes, at Easter (13 April) in 1012. Also negotiated at this time was the freedom of Ælfheah of Canterbury, but the archbishop refused to be ransomed and was killed by his captors in frustration. In the same year Eadric ravaged St David's in Wales.

Invasion
In 1013, Sweyn Forkbeard arrived in England with the intention of crowning himself King of England. By the end of 1013, English resistance had collapsed and Sweyn had conquered the country. Eadric's position at this time is not clear, but according to Roger of Wendover, Eadric "crossed over" the channel to Normandy with Queen Emma "and a hundred an forty soldiers". Æthelred followed them in January 1014.

However, the situation suddenly changed when Sweyn died on 3 February 1014. The crews of the Danish ships in the Trent, who had previously supported Sweyn, immediately swore their allegiance to his son Cnut; but leading English noblemen sent a proposal to Æthelred to negotiate Æthelred's restoration to the throne. He was required to declare his loyalty to the noblemen, to bring in reforms regarding everything that they previously disliked, and to forgive all that had been said and done against him in his previous reign. Æthelred soon regained his throne with assistance from Olaf Haraldsson; Cnut went back to Denmark, while his allies were punished for their cooperation with him.

In 1015, there was a council held in Oxford, to which Eadric invited the brothers Sigeferth and Morcar, who were two thegns from the Seven Burhs in the East Midlands. Unfortunately for them, Eadric had them killed – possibly due to their collaboration with the Danes. This enabled Prince Edmund to confiscate their lands.

Return of the Danes
Cnut arrived from Denmark in August 1015 at Sandwich in Kent with an invasion force of about 200 ships, but immediately went off plundering in Dorset, Wiltshire and Somerset. Eadric collected an army at Cosham, where king Æthelred lay sick. Edmund came to join him from the North, where his new territories lay. It is believed that Eadric had the intention of betraying Edmund, but when their forces came together he could not. The armies separated without incident, and Eadric soon took forty ships from the royal fleet, fled to Cnut, and entered into his service.

Around the New Year, Eadric accompanied Cnut into Warwickshire, where they plundered, burned and slew all they met. Prince Edmund assembled an army to face them, but his Mercian forces refused to fight the Danes and disbanded. Edmund went on to assemble another army and, with the assistance of Earl Uhtred of Northumbria, plundered Eadric's lands in Staffordshire, Shropshire, and Cheshire. Uhtred returned to his occupied Northumbria to submit to Cnut, but he was killed and replaced with Eric Haakonsson.

Æthelred died on 23 April in London; his son Edmund was elected king of what was left of his father's kingdom. But Edmund was left little time: the Danish army went south to London, Edmund left for Wessex, Eadric and Cnut followed him, and two inconclusive battles were fought at Penselwood in Somerset and Sherston in Wiltshire, which lasted two days. The first day was bloody but inconclusive; on the second, Edmund had the upper hand but Eadric:

Edmund's forces did flee initially, but when they realised he was still alive, fought with him until dusk. Eadric and Cnut left the battle and returned to London under cover of darkness. Edmund soon went on to rescue London, driving Eadric and Cnut away and defeating them after crossing the Thames at Brentford; but he suffered heavy losses. He then withdrew to Wessex to gather fresh troops, and the Danes again brought London under siege. But after another unsuccessful assault, the Danes withdrew into Kent, under attack by the loyalists. After a final defeat at Otford, Eadric met Edmund at Aylesford and was accepted back into Edmund's good graces. Cnut set sail northwards across the sea to Essex, and went up the River Orwell to ravage Mercia.

Battle of Assandun

On 18 October 1016, the Danes were engaged by Edmund's army as they retired towards their ships, leading to the Battle of Assandun – fought more probably at Ashingdon, in south-east, or Ashdon, in north-west Essex. In the ensuing struggle, Eadric, whose return to the English side was perhaps a ruse, withdrew his forces from the field of battle, and as the Anglo-Saxon Chronicle puts it, he "betrayed his natural lord and all the people of England", bringing about a decisive English defeat.

Edmund and Cnut made peace on the advice of Eadric on Ola's island near Deerhurst. It was decided that England would be split in half at the Thames, Cnut in the North and Edmund in the South; however, Edmund did not live much longer and Cnut became sole ruler of England. Eadric held his position as Ealdorman of Mercia.

Death
While at the royal palace in London, Eadric was killed at the command of King Cnut, along with three other prominent English nobles: Northman, son of Leofwine, Æthelweard, son of Æthelmær the Stout, and Brihtric, son of Ælfhheah, Ealdorman of Devon. According to the Encomium Emmae It was done under claim that those executed had not fought "faithfully" for their liege Edmund and "whom he (Cnut) knew to have been deceitful, and to have hesitated between the two sides with fraudulent tergiversation." The Encomium also says that Cnut ordered Earl Eric Haakonsson to "pay this man what we owe him" and he chopped off his head with his axe.

The exact date of Eadric's death is not given by any source, but John of Worcester states that Cnut gave the order on Christmas Day, therefore it is likely he died on 25 December 1017. Cnut ordered his body to be thrown over the city wall, and left unburied. Henry of Huntingdon says that Eadric's head was "placed upon a pole on the highest battlement of the tower of London". Eadric is not known to have had any children. His position was at some point filled by Leofric, the brother of Eadric's knight Northman, the family of whom held Mercia until after the Norman conquest.

Character

In 2005, Eadric Streona was selected by historians for a poll conducted by the BBC History Magazine as the 11th century's worst Briton.

Notes

Citations

Sources

External links
 

10th-century births
1017 deaths
11th-century English nobility
Anglo-Saxon warriors
People executed under the Anglo-Saxons
Executed English people
11th-century executions
Ealdormen of Mercia